Walter Robert Briggs (born August 6, 1965) is a former American football quarterback who played for the New York Jets of the National Football League (NFL). He played college football at Montclair State University.

References

Further reading
 

1965 births
Living people
American football quarterbacks
Montclair State Red Hawks football players
New York Jets players
National Football League replacement players